Ian D. Shugart   is a Canadian politician and retired public servant who has been a senator from Ontario since September 27, 2022. Prior to his appointment to the Senate, Shugart held a number of senior roles within the Public Service of Canada, including as the 24th clerk of the Privy Council and secretary to the Cabinet from 2019 to 2021.

Education 
Shugart graduated in from Trinity College at the University of Toronto with a Bachelor of Arts in political economy.

Career

Political staffer 
Shugart began his career in Ottawa in 1980 as a political staffer, where he was a constitutional policy advisor to Progressive Conservative (PC) leader Joe Clark and later policy director under Brian Mulroney, when the PCs formed the Official Opposition. Mulroney formed government in 1984 and Shugart worked as a senior policy advisor to the minister of national health and welfare, Jake Epp. When Epp became minister of energy, mines and resources in 1989, Shugart became his chief of staff.

Public Service 
In 1991, Shugart joined the Public Service of Canada, taking a job as the assistant secretary for the social policy and programs branch in the Federal-Provincial Relations Office. He would go on to serve in a number of roles in the federal government, including as the executive director of the Medical Research Council (1993–1997), as an assistant deputy minister with Health Canada (1997–2006), and as the associate deputy minister with Environment Canada (2006–2008).

Shugart was promoted to deputy minister for Environment Canada in 2006, where he supported international climate change negotiations and the regulation of greenhouse gas emissions. In 2010, he joined Employment and Social Development Canada as its deputy minister, where he worked on labour market and income security initiatives. He became deputy minister of foreign affairs at Global Affairs Canada in 2016, where he managed national security issues and bilateral relationships.

Clerk of the Privy Council 
In 2019, Prime Minister Justin Trudeau announced that Shugart would become the 24th clerk of the Privy Council and secretary to the Cabinet – the head of the Public Service – following the resignation of Michael Wernick.

In 2021, Shugart stepped aside in order to receive cancer treatment. Former clerk Janice Charette, Canada's high commissioner to the United Kingdom assumed the role on an interim basis.

Retirement 
Shugart resigned in 2022 and Charette assumed the role of clerk.

He joined the University of Toronto's Munk School of Global Affairs and Public Policy in May 2022 as a part-time professor.

Political career 
On September 26, 2022, the Prime Minister's Office announced that Shugart had been appointed to represent Ontario in the Senate of Canada.

References

External links 
 Official biography

1957 births
Clerks of the Privy Council (Canada)
Trinity College (Canada) alumni
Living people
Canadian senators from Ontario
Independent Canadian senators
Members of the King's Privy Council for Canada